Nevzat Süer (1925 – 23 March 1987) was a Turkish chess player. He was a Turkish Chess Champion.

Biography 
Süer was born in 1925, graduated from Haydarpaşa High School, started playing chess in 1943. He earned FIDE title, International Master (IM) in 1975. He is considered one of the pioneers of Turkish modern chess history with his articles in Cumhuriyet newspaper and the Süer Chess Magazine he published.

He died in 1987. After his death, Turkey's first chess park, opened in Yalova in 2016, was named after him.

References 

Turkish chess players
1987 deaths
1925 births
Haydarpaşa High School alumni